Kahit Isang Araw Lang Unity Run was a run organized by UNTV. It was held in SM Mall of Asia, Pasay, Metro Manila, Philippines on January 22, 2012. The advocacy of Kuya, Daniel Razon (CEO of UNTV) also known as "Mr. Public Service", was to create another historic fun run for education with at least 300,000 participants.

Razon said, "The Project is actually a fitting follow up of a similar event last held last 2010 that not only left a mark in history in terms of the number of participants, but for the realization of its advocacy of providing free college education to beneficiaries."

In partnership with the Department of Education, Razon and the Department of Education Secretary, Armin Luistro, made a deal in response to the shortage of some aspects of education.

The "Adapt A School Project" is one of their initiatives. The 2012 Unity Run was the second charity fun run organized by Breakthroughs and Milestone Productions International through Razon and marketing firm Avant Garde Creatives. In 2010, the record-breaking Kahit Isang Araw Lang - Takbo Para sa Libreng Kolehiyo (Just for One Day - Run for Free College) attracted more than 50,000 runners. The event was the second project formed between Razon and the former head for the Adopt-a-School program.

In 2012 a two-story building with seven classrooms was constructed at Apalit National High School in Pampanga.

The run also funded two units of classroom on wheels, called Dunong-Gulong,  that aim to bring education to out-of-school youth and adult learners in remote provinces. The product of the first marathon-for-a-cause, La Verdad Christian College in the Apalit and Caloocan branches, continues to support the free education of roughly 700 elementary, high school, and college students.

The Department of Education participated in Kahit Isang Araw Lang Unity Run.

The run was planned to go to different cities: Cebu (Cebu Business Park), Davao (SM City Davao), Puerto Princesa (Mendoza Park), Tacloban (Tacloban City Hall grounds), Butuan City (Butuan City sports complex), Bacolod Panaad Stadium.

References 

Road running competitions
2012 in the Philippines
Sports in Metro Manila